Events from the year 1960 in Jordan.

Incumbents
Monarch: Hussein 
Prime Minister: Hazza' al-Majali (until 29 August), Bahjat Talhouni (starting 29 August)

Events

Deaths
 29 August - Hazza' al-Majali.

See also

 Years in Iraq
 Years in Syria
 Years in Saudi Arabia

References

 
1960s in Jordan
Jordan
Jordan
Years of the 20th century in Jordan